Peroxybenzoic acid is an organic compound with the formula C6H5CO3H. It is the simplest aryl peroxy acid.  It may be synthesized from benzoic acid and hydrogen peroxide, or by the treatment of benzoyl peroxide with sodium methoxide, followed by acidification.

Like other peroxyacids, it may be used to generate epoxides, such as styrene oxide from styrene:

References

Organic peroxy acids
Phenyl compounds